GP Planum is a Serbian construction company headquartered in Zemun, Serbia.

History
GP Planum was established in January 1948 in Zemun, Belgrade, SFR Yugoslavia. GP Planum is one of the main subcontractors for the A2 motorway in Serbia.

References

External links
 

1948 establishments in Serbia
Companies based in Belgrade
Companies established in 1948
Construction and civil engineering companies of Serbia
Construction and civil engineering companies established in 1948